Capt. Alberto Valdés Ramos (25 June 1919 – 14 April 2013 ) was a Mexican equestrian and Olympic champion. Born in Mexico City, he won a gold medal riding his horse Chihuahua in the show jumping competition for the Mexican team along with Humberto Mariles and Rubén Uriza at the 1948 Summer Olympics in London. Capt. Valdes and Chihuahua placed equal 10th on a total of 20 points in the individual competition. His teammate Col. Humberto Mariles riding Arete won the individual gold medal on a total of 6.25 points.

His son Alberto Valdés Jr. won a bronze medal at the 1980 Summer Olympics.

References

1919 births
2013 deaths
Sportspeople from Mexico City
Mexican male equestrians
Equestrians at the 1948 Summer Olympics
Olympic equestrians of Mexico
Olympic gold medalists for Mexico
Olympic medalists in equestrian
Medalists at the 1948 Summer Olympics
Pan American Games medalists in equestrian
Pan American Games bronze medalists for Mexico
Equestrians at the 1951 Pan American Games
Medalists at the 1951 Pan American Games